Michael P. Mitchell (June 5, 1925 – March 3, 2017) was an American politician and political advisor who served as a member of the Idaho House of Representatives and Idaho Senate.

Early life and education 
Mitchell was raised in Lewiston, Idaho and attended St. Joseph's Military School in Belmont, California. In 1940, Mitchell returned to Lewiston to complete high school. During World War II, Mitchell served in the United States Navy as a machinist. After the war, Mitchell earned a Bachelor of Arts degree in journalism from the University of Oregon.

Career 
After graduating from college, Mitchell worked for his father's beer distribution company, which later became a local distributor of Coors Brewing Company. In 1968, Mitchell was elected to serve as a member of the Idaho House of Representatives. After serving one term, he was elected to the Idaho Senate, serving for six terms. In 1982, Mitchell was an unsuccessful candidate for Lieutenant Governor of Idaho. Mitchell later served as a legislative liaison for Governor John Evans and chief of staff for Governor Cecil Andrus. He also served as interim director of the Idaho Department of Correction. Mitchell was re-elected to the Idaho House of Representatives in 2002, serving until 2006.

Personal life 
Mitchell and his wife, Arlene R. Harvey, married in 1950. They had three daughters. Mitchell died at the Boise VA Medical Center in Boise, Idaho on March 3, 2017, at the age of 91.

References 

1925 births
2017 deaths
People from Lewiston, Idaho
University of Oregon alumni
Democratic Party members of the Idaho House of Representatives
Democratic Party Idaho state senators
United States Navy sailors